Porotachys bisulcatus is a species of ground beetle in the family Carabidae. It is found in North America, Europe, Africa, and temperate Asia.

References

Further reading

 

Trechinae
Articles created by Qbugbot
Beetles described in 1822